This is a list of the woredas (districts) and city administrations in the Afar region of Ethiopia, compiled from material on the Central Statistical Agency website.

Afar
Afar Region